Broadway's Best may refer to:

 Broadway's Best (radio station), a Showtunes radio station on Sirius Satellite Radio
 Broadway's Best (album), an album by Jo Stafford